Nebria punctatostriata is a species of ground beetle in the Nebriinae subfamily that can be found in Portugal and Spain.

References

External links
Nebria punctatostiata at Carabidae of the World

Beetles described in 1876
Beetles of Europe